Frederick V or Friedrich V may refer to: 

Frederick V, Duke of Swabia (1164–1170)
Frederick V, Count of Zollern (d.1289)
Frederick V, Burgrave of Nuremberg (c. 1333–1398), German noble
Frederick V of Austria (1415–1493), or Frederick III, Holy Roman Emperor
Frederick I, Margrave of Brandenburg-Ansbach (1460–1536), or Friedrich V, Margrave von Brandenburg-Ansbach-Bayreuth
Frederick V, Margrave of Baden-Durlach (1594–1659)
Frederick V, Elector Palatine (1596–1632), or Friedrich V von der Pfalz
Frederick V of Denmark (1723–1766), king of Denmark and Norway
Frederick V, Landgrave of Hesse-Homburg (1748–1820)